is a Japanese talent management firm representing a fair number of voice actors and entertainers. Founded on March 3, 1988, Sigma Seven is headquartered on the third floor of the Haga Building in Minato, Tokyo, Japan.

Notable voice actors

Female
Fumie Mizusawa
Asuka Ōgame
Reiko Takagi
Megumi Takamoto
Sakiko Tamagawa
Ai Uchikawa
Kana Ichinose 
Yukana

Male
Shin Aomori
Masaya Hashimoto
Takuro Kitagawa 
Yasunori Matsumoto
Akio Nojima
Akio Suyama
Hideki Tasaka
Norio Wakamoto
Hiroki Yasumoto
Makoto Yasumura

Formerly attached talent

Shōya Chiba (currently with Toy's Factory)
Misato Fukuen (currently with StarCrew)
Shozo Iizuka (deceased)
Kaori Ishihara (currently with Style Cube)
Marina Inoue (currently with Aoni Production)
Nana Mizuki (currently with StarCrew)
Showtaro Morikubo (currently with Add9th)
Yuichi Nakamura (currently with INTENTION)
Hirofumi Nojima (currently with Aoni Production)
Yui Ogura (currently with  Style Cube)
Asami Seto (currently with StarCrew)
Atsushi Tamaru (currently with Mausu Promotion)
Kazuki Yao (currently with Max Mix)
Hiroyuki Yoshino (currently as Freelance)

References

External links
Official Site

Mass media companies established in 1988
Japanese voice actor management companies